Heterosquilla tricarinata is a species of mantis shrimp in the family Tetrasquillidae. It is known from both the Andaman Islands and New Zealand.

Heterosquilla tricarinata live in tidal mud flats where they can experience low environmental oxygen levels. However, the shrimp is well adapted to the low oxygen levels in its habitat.

References

Stomatopoda
Marine crustaceans of New Zealand
Crustaceans described in 1871